Z37 may refer to:

Zlin Z-37 Čmelák, an aircraft
German destroyer Z37, a warship
 Point Arena Air Force Station (NORAD id Z-37), Point Arena, California, USA
 RFA Z.37 mortar battery, part of the 37th Division (United Kingdom)
 Small nucleolar RNA Z37

See also

 37 (disambiguation)
 z (disambiguation)